Jacques Robert may refer to:

 Jacques Robert (jurist) (born 1928), French jurist and university president
 Jacques Robert (film director) (1890–1928), Swiss silent actor and film director
 Jacques Robert (writer) (1921–1997), French author, screenwriter and journalist